Boydere is a village in Turkey's Şanlıurfa Province, in its Haliliye district. As of the 1990 census, it had a population of 420. There is an archaeological mound located underneath the village; an archaeological survey here unearthed Early Bronze Age and Roman-era artifacts.

References 

Villages in Şanlıurfa Province